Nisinic acid is a very long chain polyunsaturated omega-3 fatty acid, similar to docosahexaenoic acid (DHA).  The lipid name is 24:6 (n-3) and the chemical name is all-cis-6,9,12,15,18,21-tetracosahexaenoic acid.  It is not well studied, but polyunsaturated fatty acids even longer than DHA, nisinic acid included, may hold scientific promise.

References

Fatty acids